Ernemont-sur-Buchy is a commune in the Seine-Maritime department in the Normandy region in northern France.

The inhabitants of the town of Ernemont-sur-Buchy are called Ernemontois, Ernemontoises in French.

Geography

Population

Places of interest
 An eighteenth-century chateau.
 The church of St. Sauveur, dating from the end of the seventeenth - beginning of the eighteenth century.
 A convent/hospice from the seventeenth century (established in 1690).
 A sixteenth century manor house.

See also
Communes of the Seine-Maritime department

References

Communes of Seine-Maritime